Helendale or Silver Lakes is an unincorporated community and census-designated place located in the Victor Valley of the Mojave Desert, within San Bernardino County, California.

It is on historic Route 66, west of the Mojave Freeway (I-15), between Barstow and Victorville. The name Helendale is used by the USPS, while Silver Lakes is used by the US Census. The 2010 United States census reported Silver Lakes's population was 5,623.

History
Several Native American tribes lived in the area, namely the Mojave and Serrano. It is believed that the first White man to travel through was the Franciscan priest Francisco Garcés in 1776. He was exploring a route to the missions on the Coast following the Mojave River.

The original name for Helendale was Point of Rocks. There were several early trails and roadways through this area of the Mojave Desert, including the Mojave Trail, which was used by the Indians and Father Garcés, the Spanish Trail, the Santa Fe Trail, the Mormon Trail, etc.

After Father Garcés, Jedediah Smith traveled through the Point of Rocks area in 1826 on a fur trapping expedition. In 1844, John C. Frémont and his guide, Kit Carson, traveled through heading east via the Cajon Pass. During the Mexican–American War, in late 1846 or early 1847, the Mormon Battalion camped at Point of Rocks on their way to Los Angeles. They were released from the military shortly afterward and part of the battalion returned to Salt Lake City through Point of Rocks.

The first Mormon wagon train traveled through in about 1851. In 1857, Edward Fitzgerald Beale and his camel driver, Hi Jolly, brought a famous caravan through on the way to Wilmington for the Camel Corps. After a few horse ridden mail conveyance companies during the 1850s went out of business, the short-lived Pony Express began its service in the early 1860s and a stone station was built by the river at Point of Rocks. The stagecoach station at Point of Rocks was located west of where the railroad tracks were later put down. In about 1863, the station was burned by Paiute Indians of the Shoshone branch.

The Santa Fe Railroad arrived in the 1880s and built a Point of Rocks station, which provided a watering stop for the steam engine locomotives then moving trains across the High Desert. On December 15, 1897, the name was changed to Helen in honor of Helen A. Wells (born 1885), daughter of railroad executive Arthur G. Wells (1861–1932). On September 22, 1918, the name was changed to Helendale.

Route 66, or National Trails Highway, was paved and officially opened in the Helendale area in 1926. Helendale has a historical marker commemorating the old road that is located 100 yards south of the intersection of Route 66 and Vista Road. Nearby is the World War II Helendale Auxiliary Airfield.

The ZIP Code is 92342 and the community is inside area code 760.

Geography
According to the United States Census Bureau, the CDP covers an area of 5.6 square miles (14.4 km), 5.2 square miles (13.4 km) of it land, and 0.4 square miles (1.0 km) of it (7.15%) water.

Helendale is located in a generally flat area in the Mojave Desert, between Victorville and Barstow.

The town consists primarily of the Silver Lakes resort community, which is built around two manmade lakes. Water for these lakes comes from Mojave River, which, while dry at the surface, has flow underground.

Climate
Helendale is in a desert climate. Like most of the Mojave Desert, it has cool winters and hot summers and very little rainfall. It often will remain dry while nearby Victorville and Barstow are experiencing flash floods. For this reason, natives called the area "The hole in the sky."

Public Safety
Law enforcement is provided by the San Bernardino County Sheriff's Department out of the Adelanto Station.  Traffic enforcement is provided by the California Highway Patrol.  The San Bernardino County Fire Department maintains a full-time station with paramedics near the Post Office on Helendale Road. Private security firms are hired by the Silverlakes Association and consistently patrol the amenities of Silver Lakes.

Demographics
The 2010 United States Census reported that Silver Lakes had a population of 5,623. The racial makeup of Silver Lakes was 4,566 (81.2%) White (71.8% Non-Hispanic White), 315 (5.6%) African American, 39 (0.7%) Native American, 198 (3.5%) Asian, 15 (0.3%) Pacific Islander, 270 (4.8%) from other races, and 220 (3.9%) from two or more races. Hispanic or Latino of any race were 907 persons (16.1%).

The Census reported that 5,623 people (100% of the population) lived in households, 0 (0%) lived in non-institutionalized group quarters, and 0 (0%) were institutionalized.

There were 2,238 households, out of which 654 (29.2%) had children under the age of 18 living in them, 1,392 (62.2%) were opposite-sex married couples living together, 201 (9.0%) had a female householder with no husband present, 83 (3.7%) had a male householder with no wife present.  There were 94 (4.2%) unmarried opposite-sex partnerships, and 14 (0.6%) same-sex married couples or partnerships. 458 households (20.5%) were made up of individuals, and 253 (11.3%) had someone living alone who was 65 years of age or older. The average household size was 2.51.  There were 1,676 families (74.9% of all households); the average family size was 2.89.

The population was spread out, with 1,267 people (22.5%) under the age of 18, 324 people (5.8%) aged 18 to 24, 1,099 people (19.5%) aged 25 to 44, 1,642 people (29.2%) aged 45 to 64, and 1,291 people (23.0%) who were 65 years of age or older.  The median age was 46.5 years. For every 100 females, there were 96.7 males.  For every 100 females age 18 and over, there were 94.3 males.

The homeowner vacancy rate was 7.3%; the rental vacancy rate was 12.0%.  4,008 people (71.3% of the population) lived in owner-occupied housing units and 1,615 people (28.7%) lived in rental housing units.

The census also defines a Zip Code Tabulation Area (ZCTA), 92342, for Helendale, California, which includes surrounding rural areas. As of the 2000 census, there were 4,936 people and 4,909 households in the ZCTA of 92342. The population was made up of 50.5% males and 49.5% females. The median age was 45.7.

According to the 2010 United States Census, Silver Lakes had a median household income of $67,214, with 12.1% of the population living below the federal poverty line.

Places of interest
 Cottonwood Park
 Silver Lakes Country Club
 South Lake Park
 Desert Fox airsoft field
 Elmers Bottle Tree Ranch
 Caroli Lake Club

References

External links
 High Desert News
 California Route 66 History
 Kit Carson and the Santa Fe Trail
 San Bernardino County Fire

Populated places in the Mojave Desert
Census-designated places in San Bernardino County, California
Unincorporated communities in San Bernardino County, California
Victor Valley
U.S. Route 66 in California
Census-designated places in California
Unincorporated communities in California